Mário Peres Ulibarri, (born March 19, 1947 in Sorocaba), known as Marinho Peres, is a former association footballer. He played centre-back, in particular with Sport Club Internacional and the Brazil national team. He captained the Brazil Team to a fourth place at the World Cup 1974. He became a coach after retiring.

National team
Marinho Peres has 15 caps (3 non official) with the Brazil national team (one goal). He played during the 1974 FIFA World Cup (seven games, fourth place).

Honours as a player
Campeonato Paulista (São Paulo State championship) in 1973 with São Paulo Futebol Clube
Winner Campeonato Brasileiro (Brazilian championship) in 1976 with Sport Club Internacional
Winner Campeonato Gaúcho (Rio Grande do Sul championship) in 1976 with Sport Club Internacional

Honours as a coach
Cup of Portugal in 1989 with Belenenses.
Taça Guanabara (Guanabara Cup) in 1997 with Botafogo.

External links

Marinho Peres coach career at Sambafoot
CBF 

Living people
1947 births
People from Sorocaba
Brazilian people of Spanish descent
Brazilian footballers
Brazilian football managers
Sport Club Internacional players
Santos FC players
FC Barcelona players
Association football central defenders
1974 FIFA World Cup players
Brazil international footballers
Primeira Liga managers
Sporting CP managers
C.F. Os Belenenses managers
Brazilian expatriate sportspeople in Angola
Campeonato Brasileiro Série A players
La Liga players
El Salvador national football team managers
Expatriate football managers in El Salvador
Brazilian expatriate sportspeople in El Salvador
Vitória S.C. managers
Expatriate football managers in Angola
Atlético Sport Aviação managers
União São João Esporte Clube managers
Paysandu Sport Club managers
Esporte Clube Juventude managers
America Football Club (RJ) managers
Botafogo de Futebol e Regatas managers
Footballers from São Paulo (state)